Conocyemidae is a family of worms belonging to the class Rhombozoa, order unknown.

Genera:
 Conocyema Van Beneden, 1882
 Microcyema Van Beneden, 1882

References

Dicyemida